The French edition of Vogue magazine, formerly called Vogue Paris, is a fashion magazine that has been published since 1920.

History

1920–54

The French edition of Vogue was first issued on 15 June 1920, the first editor-in-chief being Cosette de Brunhoff (1886–1964). Her brother, Michel de Brunhoff (1892–1958) took over and was editor-in-chief from 1929 until 1954.

Under Edmonde Charles-Roux (1954–66)
Edmonde Charles-Roux (1920–2016), who had previously worked at Elle and France-Soir, became the magazine’s editor-in-chief in 1954. Charles-Roux was a great supporter of Christian Dior's "New Look", of which she later said, "It signalled that we could laugh again - that we could be provocative again, and wear things that would grab people's attention in the street." In August 1956, the magazine issued a special ready-to-wear (prêt-à-porter) issue, signaling a shift in fashion's focus from couture production.

She left Vogue in 1966, as the result of a conflict for wanting to place a black woman on the cover of the magazine. When later asked about her departure, Charles-Roux refused to confirm or deny this account.

1968–2000: Crescent, Pringle, and Buck
Francine Crescent (1933–2008), whose editorship would later be described as prescient, daring, and courageous, took the helm of French Vogue in 1968. Under her leadership, the magazine became the global leader in fashion photography. Crescent gave Helmut Newton and Guy Bourdin, the magazine's two most influential photographers, complete creative control over their work. During the 1970s, Bourdin and Newton competed to push the envelope of erotic and decadent photography; the "prone and open-mouthed girls of Bourdin" were pitted against the "dark, stiletto-heeled, S&M sirens of Newton". At times, Bourdin's work was so scandalous that Crescent "laid her job on the line" to preserve his artistic independence. The two photographers greatly influenced the late-20th-century image of womanhood and were among the first to realize the importance of image, as opposed to product, in stimulating consumption. Through the power photography within fashion both Bourdin and Newton were able to create new avenues within the world of fashion as well as advance the image of Vogue. 

By the late 1980s, however, Newton and Bourdin's star power had faded, and the magazine was "stuck in a rut". Colombe Pringle replaced Crescent as the magazine's editor-in-chief in 1987.  Under Pringle’s watch, the magazine recruited new photographers such as Peter Lindbergh (1944–2019) and Steven Meisel, who developed their signature styles in the magazine’s pages.  Even still, the magazine struggled, remaining dull and heavily reliant on foreign stories. When Pringle left the magazine in 1994, word spread that her resignation had been forced.

Joan Juliet Buck, an American, was named Pringle's successor effective 1 June 1994. Her selection was described by The New York Times as an indication that Conde Nast intended to "modernize the magazine and expand its scope" from its circulation of 80,000. Buck's first two years as editor-in-chief were extremely controversial; many employees resigned or were fired, including the magazine's publishing director and most of its top editors. Though rumors circulated in 1996 that the magazine was on the verge of a shutdown, Buck persevered; during her editorship, the magazine’s circulation ultimately increased 40 percent.<ref name=horyn>Horyn, Cathy. "Front row: New home for the best-dressed list? De Niro's dresser now has a store -- Editor of French Vogue calls it quits." The New York Times (12 December 2000).</ref> Buck remade the magazine in her own cerebral image, tripling the amount of text in the magazine and devoting special issues to art, music, literature, and science. Juliet Buck announced her decision to leave the magazine in December 2000, after her return from a two-month leave of absence. The Sydney Morning Herald later compared her departure, which took place during Milan's fashion week, to the firing of a football coach during a championship game. Carine Roitfeld, who had been the magazine's creative director, was named as Buck's successor the next April.

Under Carine Roitfeld (2001–2011)
Roitfeld aimed to restore the magazine's place as a leader in fashion journalism (the magazine "hadn't been so good" since the 1980s, she said) and to [restore] its French identity. Her appointment, which coincided with the ascendance of young designers at several of the most important Paris fashion houses, "brought a youthful energy" to the magazine. By April 2002, she had rid the magazine of foreign staffers, making it "all French for the first time in many years". The magazine also underwent a redesign by the Paris-based design firm M/M (Paris). It aimed to make the title appear more hand-crafted and organic, particularly through the use of collage and hand-drawn fonts. Continuity was created through the use of loose theming for each issue, smooth pacing, and visual uniformity in the shopping pages.

The magazine’s aesthetic evolved to resemble Roitfeld's (that is, "svelte, tough, luxurious, and wholeheartedly in love with dangling-cigarette, bare-chested fashion"). Roitfeld has periodically drawn criticism for the magazine's use of sexuality and humor, which she employs to disrupt fashion's conservatism and pretension. Roitfeld's Vogue is unabashedly elitist, "unconcerned with making fashion wearable or accessible to its readers". Models, not actresses promoting movies, appear on its cover. Its party pages focus on the magazine's own staff, particularly Roitfeld and her daughter Julia Restoin Roitfeld. Its regular guest-editorships are given to it-girls like Kate Moss, Sofia Coppola, and Charlotte Gainsbourg. According to The Guardian, "what distinguishes French Vogue is its natural assumption that the reader must have heard of these beautiful people already. And if we haven't? The implication is that that's our misfortune, and the editors aren't about to busy themselves helping us out." Advertising revenue rose 60 percent in 2005, resulting in the best year for ad sales since the mid-1980s. On 17 December 2010, Carine announced her departure from Vogue Paris'' effective 31 January 2011.

Under Emmanuelle Alt (2011–present)
On 7 January 2011, it was announced that Emmanuelle Alt, who had been the magazine fashion director for the last 10 years, would become the new editor-in-chief effective February 1st.

See also
 List of Vogue Paris cover models
 List of women's magazines
 List of men's magazines

References

External links
Vogue Paris
Vogue Paris in English 

 Digitized issues of Vogue Paris in Gallica, the digital library of the BnF.

1920 establishments in France
Condé Nast magazines
French-language magazines
Monthly magazines published in France
Women's magazines published in France
Magazines established in 1920
Magazines published in Paris
Women's fashion magazines
Paris
French fashion